Jan Niklas (born 15 October 1947) is a German film and television actor. He is best known for appearing in TV films such as Peter The Great, Anastasia: The Mystery of Anna and Anne Frank: The Whole Story. He won a Golden Globe Award for his appearance in the TV miniseries Anastasia: The Mystery of Anna. He also played in the Hungarian film Colonel Redl which was nominated for the Academy Award for Best Foreign Language Film.

Early life
Jan Niklas was born on 15 October 1947 in Pottenstein, near Nuremberg, Germany. After attending boarding school in Britain, he took acting classes in London, then he completed three years of acting classes at the Max Reinhardt Academy in Berlin.

Career
Niklas made his first television appearance on an episode of the German TV series Sonderdezernat K1 as Juniorchef. After playing in a couple of TV films and miniseries he slowly gained popularity. His breakthrough came in 1985, when he was cast in supporting role in István Szabó's war film Oberst Redl. 

In 1986 he was cast to portray a young Peter the Great in the miniseries Peter the Great. A lot of newspapers and magazines stated that it was Niklas' performance that made the miniseries so believable, and the Miami Herald stated: "It’s Niklas’ vigorously effective portrayal of the younger Peter that hooks a viewer into caring about this legendary figure. Due to his energetic performance the first two parts of “Peter the Great” are the most absorbing". TV Guide stated that Niklas was the Discovery of the year in 1986. 

Niklas received a Golden Globe nomination for Best Performance by an Actor in a Mini-Series or Motion Picture Made for Television, but lost to James Woods (Promise). 

However, later that same year, his "style and flair" was recognized throughout the industry, and brought him to the historical drama Anastasia: The Mystery of Anna in which he portrayed Prince Erich. The Boston Globe called it "a performance worth remembering". Niklas won the Golden Globe Award for Best Performance by an Actor in a Supporting Role in a Series, Mini-Series or Motion Picture Made for Television for his performance. 

After this, he appeared in films such as: The Rose Garden, Dr. M, Red Hot and The House of the Spirits. He stayed unnoticed for a while, until in 2001 he was cast as Fritz Pfeffer in the Emmy Award-winning miniseries Anne Frank: The Whole Story. This was, according to The Detroit News, "completely believable". His latest appearance was in the German film Die Zeit, die man Leben nennt.

Filmography

Awards and nominations

Wins
  Golden Globe Award for Best Performance by an Actor in a Supporting Role in a Series, Mini-Series or Motion Picture Made for TV (for Anastasia: The Mystery of Anna)

Nominations
 Golden Globe Award for Best Performance by an Actor in a Mini-Series or Motion Picture Made for TV (for Peter the Great)

References

External links
 Official website
 
 Jan Niklas at Yahoo! Movies
 

1947 births
Living people
Male actors from Munich
German male television actors
German male film actors
20th-century German male actors
21st-century German male actors
Best Supporting Actor Golden Globe (television) winners